French Guianese Creole (Kriyòl; also called variously Guianan Creole, Guianese Creole in English and Créole guyanais or Guyanais in French) is a French-based creole language spoken in French Guiana, and to a lesser degree, in Suriname and Guyana. It resembles Antillean Creole, but there are some lexical and grammatical differences between them. Antilleans can generally understand French Guianese Creole, though there may be some instances of confusion. The differences consist of more French and Brazilian Portuguese influences (due to the proximity of Brazil and Portuguese presence in the country for several years). There are also words of Amerindian and African origin. There are French Guianese communities in Suriname and Guyana who continue to speak the language.

It should not be confused with the Guyanese Creole language, based on English, spoken in nearby Guyana.

History
French Guianese Creole was a language spoken between slaves and settlers. But the conditions of French Guianese Creole's constitution were quite different from the Creole of the West Indies, on the one hand because of the conflicts between French, English, Dutch, Portuguese and Spanish, and French dialects such as the Caen have greatly influenced French Guianese Creole, which has made it significantly different from the Creoles of Martinique, Haiti, St. Lucia and Guadeloupe.

There are, therefore, in French Guianese Creole many words in common with the Creoles of the West Indies. However, a number of words differentiate them significantly.

In addition, in French Guiana, the letter 'r' is mostly preserved in onset position, whereas in the West Indies the pronunciation of 'r' tends rather to approximate the semi-vowel /w/.

Possessive determiners are placed before the noun:

Orthography and phonology
French Guianese Creole is largely written using the French alphabet, with only a few exceptions. 'Q' and 'X' are replaced by 'k' and 'z' respectively. Silent 'h' is never written, unlike in Standard French, where it remains for etymological reasons. The diphthong 'OI' is replaced by 'we', but by 'o' in the words "mo" and "to".

Examples

References

French-based pidgins and creoles
French Guianan culture
Languages of French Guiana
Languages of the African diaspora
French language in the Americas
Creoles of the Americas